Hugo Oliver Keto (born 9 February 1998) is a Finnish footballer who plays a goalkeeper for Norwegian club Sandefjord.

Career
On 4 July 2014, Keto joined the youth academy of English Premier League side Arsenal.

On 9 July 2018, he joined the youth academy of Brighton in the English Premier League.

On 12 February 2019, he was sent on loan to Republic of Ireland club Waterford.

On 6 June 2020, Keto signed for HJK in Finland.

On 24 January 2022, he signed a three-year contract with Sandefjord in Norway.

References

External links
 

1998 births
Footballers from Helsinki
Living people
Finnish footballers
Finland youth international footballers
Association football goalkeepers
Veikkausliiga players
Helsingin Jalkapalloklubi players
Kakkonen players
Klubi 04 players
Sandefjord Fotball players
Expatriate footballers in England
Finnish expatriate sportspeople in England
Expatriate association footballers in the Republic of Ireland
Finnish expatriate sportspeople in Ireland
Expatriate footballers in Norway
Finnish expatriate sportspeople in Norway
21st-century Finnish people